Sara Blædel (born 6 August 1964) is a Danish author. She is best known for her crime fiction novels featuring Louise Rick. Blædel founded the "Sara B" crime fiction publishing company in 1993, and in 1995 she started to work as a journalist.

Personal life 
Blædel was born in Copenhagen and grew up in Hvalsø, Denmark. She is the daughter of journalist Leif Blædel and actress Annegrethe Nissen.

Novels
Her novels have been published in 31 countries.

Scandinavia
Blædel's first novel was Grønt støv, first published in Denmark in 2004, followed by Kald mig prinsesse (2005), Kun ét liv (2007), Aldrig mere fri (2008), Hævnens gudinde (2009), Dødsengelen (2010), and De glemte piger (2011). Until 2008, Blædel's books were published in Denmark by Lindhardt and Ringhof. Since 2008, her publisher has been People's Press.

Blædel's publications in other Scandinavian countries include:
 Sweden: Aldrig mera fri (2009), De bortglömda (2012)
 Norway: De glemte pikene (2013), Bare ett liv (2009), Kall meg prinsesse (2007), Grönt støv (2007)
 Finland: Nimimerkki Prinsessa (2013), Vain yksi elämä (2014), Hyvästit vapaudelle (2015)
 Iceland: Hefndargyðjan (2011), Aldrei framar frjáls (2010), Aðeins Eitt Líf (2012), Kallaðu Mig Prinsessu

North America

In May, 2013, Grand Central Publishing bought The Forgotten Girls and the next book in the Louise Rick series.

United States and Canada: Farewell to Freedom (2012), Only One Life (2012), Call Me Princess (2011), In the Shadow of Sadd (2012; co-written with Steen Langstrup, Gretelise Holm, and Lars Kjaedegaard)

Europe
 United Kingdom: Blue Blood (2012)
 Germany: Unschuld (2010), Nur ein Leben (2008), Tödliches Schweigen (2006), Grüner Schnee (2006)
 Italy: Mai Più Libera (2012), Le Bambine Dimenticate (2017), La foresta assassina (2018)
 Spain: Sin Salida (2010), Sin Piedad (2011)
 Netherlands: Chatprinses (2010), De vergeten zusjes (2013)
 Poland: Handlarz Śmiercią (2012), Mam na imię Księżniczka (2012), Tylko jedno życie (2013), Pożegnanie wolności (2013)
 Greece: ΠΡΑΣΙΝΗ ΣΚΟΝΗ (2012)
 Hungary: Bízz bennem (2009)
 France: "Les filles oubliées" (2015)

Asia
 Korea: 콜미 프린세스 (2011)
 Japan: 見えない傷痕 (2012)

Other publications
 Anne-Marie- dronning uden rige (2000)
 Trods modvind - om at komme videre with Hans Engell, Ritt Bjerregaard, Jarl Friis-Mikkelsen, Ditte Gråbøl, Mimi Jacobsen and Flemming Enevold (2002)
 Dødelig alvor with Leif Davidsen (2012)

Recognition 
Blædel has been voted Most Popular Author in Denmark four times.

References

External links 
 

Women mystery writers
1964 births
Danish women novelists
Living people
Danish women journalists
20th-century Danish women writers
20th-century Danish writers
20th-century Danish journalists
21st-century Danish novelists
21st-century Danish women writers
Writers from Copenhagen
Danish crime fiction writers